Powder Snow was the second album by Megumi Odaka (1989).

Track listing
"White Love" – 4:13
"One more time" – 4:15
"OMOIDE" – 4:43
"Mitsumete" – 4:21
"Stance" – 3:59
"Shumatsu no Cinderellatachi" – 4:20
"Attention" – 3:53
"Fuyuzora ni Orion" – 4:26
"Koishitara" – 3:41
"Christmas Eve no Page" – 4:45

Credits
Director: Mitsuo Shimano
Recording and mixing engineer: Noriyasu Murase
A. engineer: Tatsumi Takagishi
Mixing studio: Kawaguchiko Studio
All songs composed by: Tsugutoshi Goto
All lyrics written by: Eiko Kyo
All songs arranged by: Tsugutoshi Goto, Satoshi Kadokura, Takeshi Fujii (arranger), Hiroaki Sugawara
Drums: Nobuo Eguchi, Hideo Yamaki, 
Bass by: Tsugutoshi Goto
Guitar: Tsuyoshi Kon, Takayuki Hijikata
Latin: Motoya Hamaguchi
Keyboard: Satoshi Kadokura, Shingo Kobayashi
Manipulator: Takeshi Fujii, Hiroaki Sugawara, Itaru Sakota
Chorus: Junko Hirotani, Atsuko Honda, Yuiko Tsubokura, Yasuhiro Kido, Kiyoshi Hiyama
"Shumatsu no CINDERELLA tachi":
 Music coordinator: Yasuhiro Sato (Daybreak), Shigeru Ohtake (Daybreak)
Art director: Isao Sakai (soap)
Photographer: Kiyotaka Saitoh
Stylist: Chisa Sugino
Hair and make-up: Yohko Ohhira
Designer: Rikaco Furuya
Chief manager: Tomokazu Ichimura
Personal manager: Hiromi Katakura
Disc promoter: Yukihiro Hoshino
Sales promoter: Keiichi Hosoji

1989 albums
Pony Canyon albums
Megumi Odaka albums